Gabriela is a 1983 Brazilian romance film directed by Bruno Barreto. It was shot in the cities of Paraty, in the state of Rio de Janeiro, and in Garopaba, Santa Catarina. It is based on Brazilian author Jorge Amado's 1958 book Gabriela, Clove and Cinnamon.

Plot
It is 1925. Nacib (Mastroianni) is the owner of bar in a small town. He meets Gabriela (Braga) and he hires her on as a cook. 
They soon enter a passionate relationship, fueled by his strong attraction to her sensual nature. However, Nacib soon grows annoyed by the attention she receives. Under advisement of his best friend, Tonico (Cantafora), Nacib proposes to her, partly in the hopes that the attention quells.

After their marriage, he insists that she dress and behave more modestly so they can be seen as more respectable. Unfortunately, Gabriela cannot help but stray and Nacib is forced to annul the marriage when he finds her in bed with Tonico. 
Later, as both Nacib and the town begin to undergo a transformation, Nacib and Gabriela resume their relationship.

Cast
 Sônia Braga as Gabriela
 Marcello Mastroianni as Nacib
 Antonio Cantafora as Tonico Bastos 
 Paulo Goulart as João Fulgêncio
 Ricardo Petráglia as Prof. Josué
 Lutero Luiz as Cel. Manoel das Onças
 Tania Boscoli as Glória 
 Nicole Puzzi as Malvina
 Flávio Galvão as Mundinho Falcão
 Joffre Soares as Cel. Ramiro Bastos
 Maurício do Valle as Cel. Amâncio Leal
 Nildo Parente as Maurício Caires
 Nelson Xavier as Capitão
 Nuno Leal Maia as Eng. Rômulo
 Chico Díaz as Chico Moleza
 Fernando Ramos da Silva as Tuísca
 Miriam Pires as Malvina's mother
 Cláudia Jimenez as Olga

References

External links

 
 

1983 films
1983 romantic comedy films
1980s Portuguese-language films
Adultery in films
Brazilian romantic comedy films
Films based on works by Jorge Amado
Films directed by Bruno Barreto
Films set in 1925
Films shot in Paraty
Films shot in Santa Catarina (state)
Metro-Goldwyn-Mayer films
Films scored by Antônio Carlos Jobim
United Artists films